Damien Leone is a film director, screenwriter, and film producer known for writing and directing All Hallows' Eve (2013), Terrifier (2016), and Terrifier 2 (2022), each of which feature his character Art the Clown.

Filmography

References

External links
 

American horror writers
Horror film directors
American screenwriters
American film editors
Special effects people
American film producers